Pisau raut (pisau meaning 'knife'; raut meaning 'trim' or 'pare') is a whittling knife that is commonly as a tool to prepare the rattan and other fine carving found throughout the entire Malay archipelago. It is well known as an accompanying knife placed in the same sheath with the mandau, a traditional weapon of the Dayak people.

Names
Pisau raut is found throughout the Borneo island of Malaysia and Indonesia where it is known by various names of different Dayak tribal languages such as munbat in Iban language, langgei or langgei puai in Ngaju language, jabang among the Dayaks of Baranjan, and haut nyu in Mandalam Kayan language.

Description

The scabbard used for the pisau raut is made of palm leaf and attached to the back of the scabbard for the mandau.

Pisau raut consists of a small blade and a wooden handle. The blade is attached to a wooden hilt that is about three times longer than the blade itself. The blade is attached to the hilt by gluing the blade onto the wooden hilt using a kind of dammar resin taken from the damar tree and then bound with rattan cords. In other version, the blade is convex on one side and concave on the other, which is similar to the design of the Dayak mandau, a much larger blade.

It is also slightly curved, following the same curve as the blade. This wooden handle is often decorated with finely carved inlaid bands made of the horn of a water buffalo or a stag. At the end of the handle is a knob which is also made of a horn of a stag, or sometimes of light-colored bone or ivory, giving it a contrast with the normally dark-colored hilt. The knob is intricately decorated with figurative representations of mythical creatures typical of Dayak art, e.g. a stylised aso dragon head above a crouching figure.

Usage
Pisau raut is used by holding the blade between thumb and index finger. Pisau raut styles that has a long hilt is held tight between the ribs and lower arms, or under the armpit. The pisau raut is used with the strength of the body while at the same time used to work on fine details. Other variety of pisau raut found in Sumatra has shorter hilt but with a reversed edged, similar to a mushroom knife. The blade of the pisau raut is usually as sharp as a shaving knife, favored by country folks for numerous fine bamboo and rattan craft works.

The pisau raut is used for harvesting and processing rattan as well as a tool to carve wood. For the Batak people, the pisau raut is also used for carving ornamentals and even Aksara. Although the pisau raut is placed in the same sheath as the weapon mandau, pisau raut was not a weapon and is mostly used as a crafting tool.

See also

Niabor
Langgai Tinggang
Jimpul

References

Cited works

 

Blade weapons
Weapons of Indonesia
Weapons of Malaysia